Kuala Tembeling is a mukim in Jerantut District, Pahang, Malaysia. The town serves as a transfer point to Taman Negara National Park, linking road transportation from various cities with boat rides to the park via the town's jetty.

References

Jerantut District
Mukims of Pahang
Towns in Pahang